Bradley Pfaff (born December 7, 1967) is an American politician and government official. A Democrat, he is a member of the Wisconsin State Senate for the 32nd senate district. The 32nd district comprises La Crosse and Crawford counties, as well as most of Vernon County and the southern half of Monroe County.

Pfaff was the Secretary-designee of the Wisconsin Department of Agriculture, Trade and Consumer Protection in the administration of Wisconsin Governor Tony Evers for most of 2019. The Republican controlled State Senate rejected his appointment ten months into his term. Pfaff subsequently worked as director of business and rural development for the Wisconsin Department of Administration.

Pfaff previously served as the Wisconsin state executive director of the Farm Service Agency and USDA deputy administrator for farm programs during the Obama administration.

Early life and education

Pfaff was born and raised on a farm in La Crosse County, Wisconsin. He earned a Bachelor of Arts degree in public and environmental administration from the University of Wisconsin–Green Bay and a Master of Public Administration from George Mason University.

Career
Pfaff served more than 12 years on the congressional staff of Congressman Ron Kind, assisting with agriculture and rural development issues. In 2004, Pfaff was a candidate for the 32nd district of the Wisconsin Senate. He was a member of the Southwest Badger Resource Conservation and Development Council. He also served on the staff of Senator Herb Kohl and for State Representative Virgil Roberts. Pfaff was elected to serve on the La Crosse County Board of Supervisors in 2007.

Obama administration 
In 2009 Pfaff was appointed the Wisconsin executive director for the Farm Service Agency at the USDA. In 2015, Pfaff was appointed to serve as the USDA Deputy Administrator for Farm Programs, a position responsible for the implementation and delivery of all Title 1 crop commodity programs and the Conservation Reserve Program. After President Obama left office in 2017, Pfaff rejoined Congressman Kind's office as deputy chief of staff.

Evers administration 
In December 2018, Governor-elect Evers announced his nomination of Pfaff to serve as secretary of DATCP for Wisconsin, subject to confirmation by the State Senate. On November 4, 2019, the Senate voted 19-14 along party lines against confirming Pfaff's nomination. One week after the Senate vote, it was announced that Pfaff had been hired to serve as director of Business and rural development for the Wisconsin Department of Administration.

State Senate
In the 2020 general election, Pfaff was elected to the Wisconsin Senate in the 32nd district. Pfaff replaced Democrat Jennifer Shilling, who resigned in May 2020 and endorsed Pfaff as her successor. Pfaff defeated Republican nominee Dan Kapanke, who had previously represented the Senate district, in a close general election contest.

2022 congressional election 

In October 2021, Pfaff declared his candidacy for the U.S. House to represent Wisconsin's 3rd congressional district following the announcement that 13-term incumbent Ron Kind would not seek re-election. In November 2022, Pfaff was narrowly defeated by Republican nominee Derrick Van Orden in the 2022 general election.

References

External links
 Brad Pfaff for Congress campaign website
 Profile at the Wisconsin Senate
 
 
 32nd Senate District map (2011–2021)

|-

1967 births
21st-century American politicians
American environmentalists
Farmers from Wisconsin
George Mason University alumni
Living people
Marymount University faculty
Obama administration personnel
People from La Crosse, Wisconsin
State cabinet secretaries of Wisconsin
University of Wisconsin–Green Bay alumni
Democratic Party Wisconsin state senators
Candidates in the 2022 United States House of Representatives elections